is a Japanese badminton player.

Career 
In 2009 and 2010 she became the semifinalist of the Osaka International tournament in women's doubles event. In 2010, she became the runner-up of the Austrian International tournament partnered with Minatsu Mitani. She also became the semifinalist at the Russian Open tournament in women's singles and doubles event. In 2011, she became the semifinalist at the New Zealand International Challenge tournament in women's doubles event partnered with Kurumi Yonao, then in November, they won Malaysia International tournament after beat Lim Yin Loo and Marylen Ng of Malaysia in straight games 21-16, 21-13.

In 2012, she became the runner-up of the Osaka International tournament in women's doubles event partnered with Kurumi Yonao after defeated by their compatriot Rie Eto and Yu Wakita with the score 21-18, 21-12. They also won Maldives and Scottish International tournaments. At Scotland, they beat Koharu Yonemoto and Yuriko Miki with the score 23-21, 21-18.

In 2014, she won the Singapore and USA International tournaments. At Singapore, they defeat Pacharapun Chochuwong and Chanisa Teachavorasinskun of Thailand with the score 21-16, 21–11; and at United States, they beat Eva Lee and Paula Lynn Obañana of United States with the score 21-10, 25-23.

In 2015, she became the runner-up of the Malaysia Masters Grand Prix Gold tournament in women's doubles event after defeated by the Danish pair Christinna Pedersen and Kamilla Rytter Juhl in straight games 21–14, 21–14. She also won the bronze medal at the 2015 BWF World Championships in women's doubles event after defeated by Perdersen and Juhl in semifinal round with the score 21-12, 21-15. She and Yonao also the semifinalist of the 2015 U.S. Open Grand Prix Gold and Hong Kong Super Series tournaments.

In 2016, she won the silver medal at the Badminton Asia Championships in women's doubles event with Yonao. They went through the final after creating a new record of the longest badminton match in two hours and forty-one minutes in the semifinal match against Greysia Polii and Nitya Krishinda Maheswari of Indonesia. In the final match, they were defeated by their teammate, Misaki Matsutomo and Ayaka Takahashi, with the score of 21–13, 21–15. She also became the runner-up of the 2016 Swiss Open Grand Prix Gold and India Super Series tournaments in women's doubles event.

In 2019, she intended to retire from the national tournament in the end of 2019 season. The farewell hold alongside the others players at the 2019 S/J League on 20 December. Fukuman will join the Synergy Badminton Academy in the United States as a head coach and for a while, she will be pairing with athletes at the academy to compete in international competitions.

Achievements

BWF World Championships 
Women's doubles

Asian Championships 
Women's doubles

World Junior Championships 
Girls' singles

BWF Superseries 
The BWF Superseries, which was launched on 14 December 2006 and implemented in 2007, was a series of elite badminton tournaments, sanctioned by the Badminton World Federation (BWF). BWF Superseries levels were Superseries and Superseries Premier. A season of Superseries consisted of twelve tournaments around the world that had been introduced since 2011. Successful players were invited to the Superseries Finals, which were held at the end of each year.

Women's doubles

  BWF Superseries Finals tournament
  BWF Superseries Premier tournament
  BWF Superseries tournament

BWF Grand Prix 
The BWF Grand Prix had two levels, the Grand Prix and Grand Prix Gold. It was a series of badminton tournaments sanctioned by the Badminton World Federation (BWF) and played between 2007 and 2017.

Women's doubles

  BWF Grand Prix Gold tournament
  BWF Grand Prix tournament

BWF International Challenge/Series 
Women's doubles

  BWF International Challenge tournament
  BWF International Series tournament

References

External links 
 

1992 births
Living people
Sportspeople from Osaka
Japanese female badminton players
Badminton players at the 2010 Summer Youth Olympics
21st-century Japanese women